Mighty animation (styled by the company as "mighty animation") is a Mexican animation studio based in Guadalajara, Mexico. It mainly specializes in 2D & CG animation, storyboarding, and designing for projects from major global brands such as Disney, Adult Swim, Netflix, and Nickelodeon.

History
Mighty animation was founded in 2012 in Guadalajara, Mexico by Luispa Salmon and Claudio Jimenez. In its early years, it mainly worked on advertisements and short films. Conejo en la Luna, which was co-produced with Canal 22, received an Ariel Award nomination.

During the 2017 Pixelatl festival in Cuernavaca, the company greenlighted Viking Tales (Vikingos in Spanish), a series of animated shorts produced by the studio in co-production of Cartoon Network's Latin American branch.

One of Mighty's inspiration comes from the tapestry weaving art.

Selected filmography
This list is incomplete. Additional titles may be added.

Television
Archibald's Next Big Thing
Charlie M
Cleopatra in Space
Droners
Legend Quest
Plop TV
Rick and Morty (season 5)
Rise of the Teenage Mutant Ninja Turtles
Saddie Sparks
Vampirina - "The Ghoul Girls"
Wild City (Ciudad salvaje)
Yakka Dee
Moon Girl and Devil Dinosaur

Film
The Bob's Burgers Movie (additional animation)
America: The Motion Picture
Cranston Academy: Monster Zone (storyboarding)
La leyenda del Charro Negro
La leyenda del Chupacabras
Untitled feature film (TBA)

Shorts
Best Baddies
Cupcakery of Doom
Juan Futbol
Mickey Mouse Thanksgiving short
Pibby
Star Wars Galaxy of Creatures
Viaje sideral
Viking Tales (Vikingos)

Others
Canal 22 - "¡Clic Clac! en invierno"
Las aventuras de Sfero & Jhonny-C (Sphero animated short)
Pixelatl
The Yellow Castle (book series)

References

External links
Mighty animation Work
mighty animation on Vimeo

Mexican companies established in 2012
Mexican animation studios
Film production companies of Mexico
Mass media in Guadalajara
Mass media companies established in 2012